Sharon Anne Blady  is a former provincial politician in the Canadian province of Manitoba. She was elected to the Legislative Assembly of Manitoba in the 2007 provincial election in the constituency of Kirkfield Park. She was defeated in the 2016 provincial election. Blady is a member of the New Democratic Party. Prior to her election, she was an instructor of social work and native studies at the University of Manitoba.

Early life and career
Blady grew up in the neighbourhood of St. James-Assiniboia in Winnipeg, Manitoba, where she attended Buchanan School, Hedges Junior High School, and Collège Silver Heights Collegiate. She received a Bachelor of Arts in anthropology, art history, and architecture from the University of Manitoba in 1991. She received a Master of Arts in history in art and native studies from the University of Victoria in 1995 with her thesis entitled The Flower Beadwork People: Factors Contributing to the Emergence of Distinctive Métis Cultural Artistic Style at Red River from 1844 to 1869. In 1996 and 1997, two papers of hers about Métis culture and history were published by the Canadian Circumpolar Institute at the University of Alberta as part of Issues in the North.

Blady designed and taught introductory courses in gender and women's studies and visual and Aboriginal art studies at Brandon University. She later taught at the University of Manitoba in its Joint Baccalaureate Nursing program and its Inner City Social Work program.

Political career
Sharon Blady was first elected to the Legislative Assembly of Manitoba in the 2007 provincial election on May 22, 2007. As the New Democratic Party candidate, she won the traditionally Progressive Conservative electoral division of Kirkfield Park with a margin of over 11%.

Blady was appointed minister's assistant for tenant issues to the Minister of Family Services and Consumer Affairs, Gord Mackintosh, on June 24, 2010. On April 4, 2011, she was promoted to the position of legislative assistant to the minister. She has also sat on a number of committees of the Legislative Assembly including the Standing Committees on Agriculture and Food (as the vice-chairperson), Crown Corporations (as the chairperson), Legislative Affairs (as the chairperson), Private Bills, Public Accounts, and Social and Economic Development (as the vice-chairperson) and the Special Committee on Senate Reform.

During her first term in the legislature, Blady introduced two private member's bills which passed. In 2009, she introduced Bill 238, The Service Animals Protection Act, which made it an offense to interfere with or allow another animal to interfere with guide dogs or other service animals without the permission of its owner. The bill passed third reading on September 23, 2009, and was granted royal assent on October 8, 2009. Through this bill, Manitoba became the first jurisdiction in Canada to specifically legislate the protection of service animals. The legislation has been praised by the Manitoba Human Rights Commission.

On April 19, 2011, Blady introduced Bill 217, The Residential Tenancies Amendment Act (Expanded Grounds for Early Termination), which added provisions to The Residential Tenancies Act to allow for the early termination of rental agreements if the tenant faces health issues that prevent them from continuing to live in their current rental unit, if they are in the armed forces and are being relocated, or if they are victims of domestic violence and believe that their safety is at risk if they continue living there. The bill was passed by the house with a unanimous vote at third reading and was assented to on June 16, 2011.

Blady is active in liaising with other legislative bodies on an international level as the President of the Manitoba section of the Parliamentary Assembly of the Francophonie and as a member of the Energy Committee of the Midwestern Legislators Conference (part of the Council of State Governments).

Blady was reelected in the 2011 provincial election on October 4 with a margin of 21 votes.

Blady was appointed as the Minister of Health of Manitoba following a cabinet reshuffle on 3 November 2014.

Blady lost her seat in the legislature to Progressive Conservative candidate Scott Fielding in the 2016 provincial election.

Electoral record

Publications

References

External links
 

Members of the Executive Council of Manitoba
New Democratic Party of Manitoba MLAs
Women MLAs in Manitoba
Academic staff of the University of Manitoba
Academic staff of Brandon University
University of Victoria alumni
University of Manitoba alumni
Year of birth missing (living people)
Living people
21st-century Canadian politicians
21st-century Canadian women politicians
Women government ministers of Canada
Health ministers of Manitoba